Nicholas Rogers is an Australian model and actor. He is best known for his role of the wizard Tarabas in the Fantaghirò series.

Early life 
He was born in Sydney on 6 March 1969, the second of three children. Living in a house right next to the coastline, he grew to love the sea and the ocean, especially water sports like swimming, surfing, etc. He was not an obedient child - he was even expelled from school because he missed a lesson in order to spend some time at the seaside. This behavior didn't stop him from graduating and starting a bright career.

Career 
At the age of 20 he went to New York and began working as a model. He was eager to try modeling as he thought of it as a short-term occupation to which he would dedicate only a year or two of his life. It turned out that he quite enjoyed those years because, despite taking a break from the fashion industry for a while, he continued to model and to be the face of famous brands long after.
One day he received a call from the Italian director Lamberto Bava, who gave him an important role in his Fantaghirò series, playing the wicked wizard Tarabas, alongside the Italian actress Alessandra Martines. Rogers was chosen amongst hundreds of candidates for the role of Tarabas.

Bava called on the actor to co-star in The Princess and the Poor (1997) and later in the 1999 mini-series Caribbean. In 1998, he was chosen to play Lorenzo in the movie Laura non c'e by Antonio Bonifacio.

He continued to work as a model and pitchman for companies such as Karl Lagerfeld and Rayban.

In 2005 he was the protagonist of The Razor's Edge, a short film set in post-apocalyptic Australia.

Nicholas Rogers, despite having taken part only in a few movie projects, managed to astonish the wide audience with his spectacular presence on screen. He has played a wide variety of characters, all of which have had their own special individualities and colorful uniqueness. In spite of his well-received performances, Rogers quit acting because he didn't gain satisfaction from it. He decided to live a peaceful life out of the limelight with his wife and long-term friend Angela, with whom he got married in 2007, and their son, born in November the same year. Nicholas Rogers owns a furniture company, as well as several clothes shops in Sydney.

Recognition 

 German "Pop Rocky" award as best actor (1998)

Filmography 
 1993 : Fantaghirò 3 by Lamberto Bava : Tarabas
 1994 : Fantaghirò 4 by Lamberto Bava : Tarabas
 1997 : The Princess and the poor by Lamberto Bava : Ademaro
 1998 : Laura non c'è by Antonio Bonifacio : Lorenzo
 1999 : Pirates, Blood Brothers by Lamberto Bava : Ferrante Albrizzi
 2000 : Maria, madre de Jesus by Fabrizio Costa : Jesus
 2005 : The Razor's edge by Gabriel Dowrick

Projects in the music industry 
 1995 : Nicholas Rogers took part in the video of the french song "Larsen" alongside the singer herself - the famut Zazie.

References

External links 

:bg:Никълъс Роджърс
 https://autogear.ru/article/218/987/nikolas-rodjers---populyarnyiy-avstraliyskiy-kinoakter-zvezda-modelnogo-biznesa/

1969 births
Living people
Australian male film actors
Australian male television actors
Male actors from Sydney
Australian male models